The 1933–34 season was the 34th season of competitive football in Belgium. The Belgium national football team qualified for the 1934 FIFA World Cup in Italy but they lost in the first round to Germany (2-5). RU Saint-Gilloise became the first club to win 10 Premier Division titles.

Overview
Belgium qualified for the FIFA World Cup finals for the second time by finishing in second place of European Group 7, ahead of Irish Free State on goal average. Belgium then lost in the round of 16 of the World Cup finals to Germany, who would eventually finish 3rd.

At the end of the season, RRC de Bruxelles and R Tilleur FC were relegated to Division I, while White Star AC (Division I A winner) and Berchem Sport (Division I B winner) were promoted to the Premier Division.
R Stade Louvaniste, CS Saint-Josse, R Union Hutoise FC and Wallonia Namur were relegated to Promotion, to be replaced by ARA Termondoise, Oude God Sport, RFC Montegnée and AS Herstal.

National team

* Belgium score given first

Key
 H = Home match
 A = Away match
 N = On neutral ground
 F = Friendly
 WCQ = World Cup qualification
 WCFR = World Cup first round
 o.g. = own goal

Honours

Final league tables

Premier Division

References
RSSSF archive – Final tables 1895–2002
Belgian clubs history 
FA website